Bharat Sundari was a national beauty pageant in India. The pageant's winner competed in the Miss World pageant from 1968 to 1975.

Categories
Bharat Sundari is in two categories:
 Miss
 Mrs
There are two stages to become Bharat Sundari:
 State Level Competition 
 National Level Pageant

Eligibility criteria
 Miss
·  Height 5'2" and above 
(5'0 for North East India)
·  Age 16-35
(as of 1 December 2019)
 Mrs
·  Height 5'2" and above 
(5’0 for North East India)
·  Age 18-50 Years
(age as on 31 December 2019)

History
The first edition of Bharat Sundari was held in 1968. Jane Coelho was crowned the first ever winner of Bharat Sundari contest and represented India at Miss World 1968 pageant.

Titleholders

Representatives to Miss World
 In 1971 and 1974 delegates to Miss World pageant

Representatives to Queen of Pacific
In 1967, Eve's Weekly Miss India sent India's representative to the pageant.

References

Beauty pageants in India
Indian awards
1968 establishments in India